Solute carrier family 45 member 3 (SLC45A3), also known as prostate cancer-associated protein 6 or prostein, is a protein that in humans is encoded by the SLC45A3 gene.

SLC45A3 is expressed in a prostate-specific manner by normal  tissues and at a significantly lower level in prostate tumor cell lines. Treatment of prostate cancer cell lines with androgens upregulates the expression of SLC45A3.

Regulation

There is evidence that the expression of SLC45A3 is regulated by the microRNA mir-126*.

References

Further reading 

 
 
 
 
 
 
 
 
 
 

Prostate cancer